Liu Shoubin (Chinese: 刘寿斌) is a male Chinese weightlifter. He competed at 1988 Seoul Olympics, and won a bronze medal in Men's 52–56 kg. 4 years later, Liu won a silver medal at 1992 Barcelona Olympics in the same event.

References

Chinese male weightlifters
Olympic weightlifters of China
Weightlifters at the 1988 Summer Olympics
Weightlifters at the 1992 Summer Olympics
Olympic silver medalists for China
Olympic bronze medalists for China
Living people
Olympic medalists in weightlifting
Medalists at the 1988 Summer Olympics
Medalists at the 1992 Summer Olympics
Asian Games medalists in weightlifting
Weightlifters at the 1990 Asian Games
Asian Games silver medalists for China
Medalists at the 1990 Asian Games
Year of birth missing (living people)
20th-century Chinese people